Appias cardena, the yellow puffin, is a butterfly in the family Pieridae. It was described by William Chapman Hewitson in 1861. It is found in the Indomalayan realm.

Subspecies
A. c. cardena (northern Borneo)
A. c. perakana (Fruhstorfer, 1902) (Peninsular Malaysia, possibly northern Sumatra)
A. c. hagar (Vollenhoven, 1865) (Sumatra)

References

External links
 Appias at Markku Savela's Lepidoptera and Some Other Life Forms

Appias (butterfly)
Butterflies described in 1861
Butterflies of Indonesia
Butterflies of Malaysia
Taxa named by William Chapman Hewitson